Johan I of East Frisia (1506–1572) was a member of the house of Cirksena and a non-reigning Count of East Frisia and later imperial governor of Limburg.  His father, Edzard the Great, had introduced primogeniture in the county of East Frisia, so that his older brother Enno II of East Frisia inherited the county alone  and he had to hold back.  Despite his ambitions, he always acknowledged his brother's rights and did not dispute the inheritance.

Unlike his father and his brother, Johan remained a Catholic.  After his father's death, he joined the imperial army.  However, he soon returned to East Frisia and began supporting his brother.  He had, however, little positive impact on his brother, who ruled unwisely.  Johan was unable to distinguish himself, and also took some unwise and ill-advised actions, such as those that lead to the Guelders feud.  He may also have encouraged Enno to try to re-introduce Catholicism in East Frisia.  This attempt was cut short when Enno died in 1540.  Enno's widow, Anna became regent for her son Edzard II.  Johan had an endless series of conflicts with Anna.

In 1538, Johan married Dorothea of Austria, the illegitimate daughter of Emperor Maximilian I.  In 1543, Emperor Charles V reminded Johan of the fact that he was still, technically, in the imperial service.  Charles appointed Johan stadtholder of the Duchy of Limburg and the three Lands Beyond the Meuse (dutch: Landen van Overmaas, french: Pays d'Outremeuse). (Valkenburg, Herzogenrath and Dalhem). Moreover, he became drossaard (judge and prime minister) of the Valkenburg Castle.

His descendants lived at Coldeborg Castle in the Rheiderland and were financially supported by the counts of East Frisia.

References and sources 
 Tielke, Martin (ed.): Biographisches Lexikon für Ostfriesland, Ostfriesisches Landschaftliche Verlag- u. Vertriebsgeschäft, Aurich, vol. 1  (1993), vol. 2  (1997), vol. 3  (2001)

References

Knights of the Golden Fleece
Counts of East Frisia
1506 births
1572 deaths
16th-century German people